Ruys is a surname. Notable people with this surname include:

 Anna Charlotte Ruys (1898–1977), Dutch epidemiologist
 Anthony Ruys (born 1947), Dutch businessman
 Cor Ruys (1889–1952), Dutch actor
 Mien Ruys (1904–1999), Dutch architect
 Tiny Ruys (born 1957), Dutch football manager